Franz Josef Kuhnle (27 April 1926 – 4 February 2021) was a German Catholic auxiliary bishop.

Kuhnle was born in Germany and was ordained to the priesthood in 1952. He served as titular bishop of Sorres and as auxiliary bishop of the Diocese of Rottenburg-Stuttgart, West Germany, from 1976 to 1990.

Notes

1926 births
2021 deaths
German Roman Catholic titular bishops
Recipients of the Order of Merit of Baden-Württemberg